Easy Skanking in Boston '78 is the fifth live album by Jamaican reggae band Bob Marley and the Wailers. It was released on February 3, 2015, by Island Records and Tuff Gong. It was recorded at the Boston Music Hall (now The Wang Theatre) on June 8, 1978, as part of the band's Kaya Tour in support of their 10th studio album, Kaya.

Easy Skanking in Boston '78 was released in three separate editions – as a stand-alone CD, on DVD/Dd and Blu-ray. The albums was released by the Marley family on his 70th birthday to honour Marley and his work. It received mixed to positive reviews from music critics.

Background

A year a half prior to the recording, Bob Marley survived an assassination attempt in Jamaica, taking bullets into the chest and arm. Easy Skanking In Boston '78 was filmed at the Wang Theatre (Boston) in (Boston,Massachusetts). The video footage's were shot with a hand-held camera by a fan that Marley allowed to sit right in front of the stage. During the filming of the band live performance in the Wang Theatre, the cinematographer was forced to change rolls of film from time to time, leaving gaps in the recording of the performance,Animation video elements were produced and created added to fill the gaps by S77 group (who have worked with the likes of Bruno Mars, Pearl Jam, Red Hot Chili,Disney and many more). The tour supported the band debut solo album, Kaya (1978). Most of the songs on Easy Skanking In Boston ‘78 originate from the album, but it also contains the band's past hits.

On February 17, 2015, this remastered unreleased concert was released by the Marley family on his 70th birthday. The DVD/Blu-Ray features video footage never seen footages of the Band and Marley.

Reception

David Jeffries of AllMusic stated: "Easy Skanking in Boston '78 marks the beginning of the Universal Music Group's archival Bob Marley series, something made possible by the Marley family, who offered up plenty of archival concert and unreleased studio recordings. This first release is a powerful show, slowly rolling up from midtempo favorites into some kicking and classic Wailers anthems like 'Jamming' and 'Exodus'. The sound quality is excellent and a vast improvement over bootlegs, which still sounded quite good, but it does seem an odd selection to launch the reggae legend's archival series, until one looks at the accompanying video release. Midnight Daver of World a Raggae wrote "This timeless live performance by the 'King of Reggae', and one of the best posthumous Marley albums to date from Island/Universal, is well worth the price of admission and proof positive that there will never be another Bob Marley."

Track listing

Charts

Personnel
Credits adapted from AllMusic.

Bob Marley - vocals, guitar
Junior Marvin – guitar, backing vocals
Al Anderson - guitar 
Aston Barrett – bass
Carlton Barrett – drums, percussion
Earl Lindo – keyboards 
Tyrone Downie – keyboards, percussion, backing vocals 
Alvin Patterson – percussion 
Rita Marley – backing vocals 
Marcia Griffiths – backing vocals
Judy Mowatt – backing vocals

References

2011 live albums
Bob Marley and the Wailers live albums